The position of Secretary of State for Dominion Affairs was a British cabinet-level position created in 1925 responsible for British relations with the Dominions – Canada, Australia, New Zealand, South Africa, Newfoundland, and the Irish Free State – and the self-governing Crown colony of Southern Rhodesia. When initially created, the office was held in tandem with that of Secretary of State for the Colonies; this arrangement persisted until June 1930. On two subsequent occasions the offices were briefly held by the same person.
The Secretary was supported by an Under-Secretary of State for Dominion Affairs. In 1947, the name of the office was changed to the Secretary of State for Commonwealth Relations.

Secretaries of State for Dominion Affairs, 1925–1947

The Viscount Addison took up the new post of Secretary of State for Commonwealth Relations on 7 July 1947.

Notes

External links

Dominion Affairs
Defunct ministerial offices in the United Kingdom
 
History of the Commonwealth of Nations
1925 establishments in the United Kingdom
1947 disestablishments in the United Kingdom
Foreign Office during World War II